Tcaci is a Moldovan occupational surname, of Slavic origin, meaning "weaver". It may refer to:

 Leonid Tcaci (b. 1970), Moldovan football manager
 Svetlana Șepelev-Tcaci (b. 1969), Moldovan long-distance runner
 Zlata Tcaci (1928–2006), Moldovan composer

See also
 Tkach
 Tcaciuc

Romanian-language surnames
Surnames of Moldovan origin